Ancylosis aspilatella is a species of snout moth in the genus Ancylosis. It was described by Ragonot, in 1887, and is known from Russia (Ural Mountains), Kazakhstan, Turkmenistan, Afghanistan,  Iran, Bahrain, the United Arab Emirates, Algeria, Egypt and Tunisia.

The wingspan is about 17 mm.

References

Moths described in 1887
aspilatella
Moths of Africa
Moths of Asia